Glenda is a feminine given name. Notable people with the name include:

Glenda (musician), Glenda López Exposito (born 1988), Cuban singer, songwriter, and flute player
Glenda Adams (born 1939), Australian author
Glenda Collins (born 1943), English pop singer
Glenda Farrell (1904–1971), American actress
Glenda Gilmore (born 1949), American historian of the Southern United States
Glenda Goertzen (born 1967), Canadian author
Glenda Hatchett (born 1951), American television jurist known as "Judge Hatchett"
Glenda Hood (born 1950), American politician
Glenda Jackson (born 1936), English actress and politician
Glenda Linscott (born 1958), Australian actress
Glenda Randerson (born 1949), New Zealand painter
Glenda Slagg, fictional columnist in Private Eye

See also
Glinda
Glenys
Glendora (feminization of Glendower)
Gwenda (given name)

References

English feminine given names